Tismana is a town in Gorj County, Oltenia, Romania. It administers ten villages: Celei, Costeni, Gornovița, Isvarna, Pocruia, Racoți, Sohodol, Topești, Vâlcele and Vânăta.

History
During the Byzantine period, Tismana was a major center of hesychasm when Nicodemus of Tismana built a monastery in Tismana during the 1300s.

Demographics
According to census data, Tismana had 7894 people in 2002. By 2011, the population had decreased to 6862.

Notable people
Nicodemus of Tismana ( – 1406)

References

 

Towns in Romania
Populated places in Gorj County
Localities in Oltenia
Places associated with hesychasm